Razak Kasim (born 5 June 1994) is a Ghanaian professional footballer who plays as a defender for Ghanaian Premier League side Accra Great Olympics.

Career 
In 2020, Kasim signed for Accra Great Olympics and was named on the club's squad list for the 2020–21 Ghana Premier League. He made his debut starting in the first match of the season, on 15 November 2020 and playing the full 90 minutes in a 1–1 draw against Medeama SC.

On 17 December 2020, he played the full 90 minutes in a 1–0 win over Kumasi Asante Kotoko with the only goal coming in from Michael Yeboah, a match which drew a lot of media buzz within the season. On 30 January 2021 during the Ga Mashie Derby, he played the full 90 minutes and helped goalkeeper Saed Salifu to keep a clean sheet in a historic 2–0 win over rivals Accra Hears of Oak, the first derby win for Olympics since 2004.

References

External links 

 

Living people
1994 births
Association football defenders
Ghanaian footballers
Accra Great Olympics F.C. players
Ghana Premier League players
Ghana A' international footballers
2022 African Nations Championship players